Blockage (Persian: سد معبر, romanized: Sade Ma'bar) is a 2017 Iranian drama film directed by Mohsen Gharaie and written by Saeed Roustayi. The film screened for the first time at the 35th Fajr Film Festival and received 4 nominations.

It was released on December 27, 2017, in Iran theatrically.

Premise 
Ghasem (Hamed Behdad), a municipality employee uses his position to put his hands on other people's money to collect enough to buy a truck, while his wife Narges (Baran Kosari) threatens to abort their child if he does not buy a house with their savings.

Cast 

 Hamed Behdad as Ghasem
 Baran Kosari as Narges
 Nader Fallah as Rasool
 Gity Ghasemi as Razieh
 Mohsen Kiaee as Mehdi
 Negar Abedi as Mona
 Alireza Kamali as Ghasem's colleague
 Bahram Sorouri Nejad

Reception

Critical response

Accolades

References

External links 
 

Films set in Tehran
Films shot in Iran
Iranian drama films
2010s Persian-language films
2017 drama films